The Antelope Range and Livestock Research Station is operated by South Dakota State University and its extension programs to improve ranching in the U.S. State of South Dakota. The site is  large, the largest of SDSU's research stations. This land was owned by the state and operated as a pronghorn antelope preserve until 1947, when it was transferred to the agricultural university for research into "the balance between cattle and sheep production and protection and renewal of range resources". Current work focuses on sustainable beef and sheep production on rangeland. There are 120 head of beef cow and 400 sheep now on the range. North Dakota State University operates a similar research station at Hettinger, North Dakota, which often partners with SDSU's Antelope station for sheep research.

It lies in the middle of Harding County, South Dakota, in the far northwest corner of the state.

See also
Antelope Range and Livestock Research Station is one of seven South Dakota State University field stations. The others are:
 Cottonwood Range and Livestock Field Station near Philip, for cow/calf and heifer management, as well as water quality issues
 Oak Lake Field Station near White, for biofuels, prairie biodiversity, fire ecology, and stream ecology
 Dakota Lakes Research Station near Pierre, for study of irrigation and drylands
 Northeast Research Station near South Shore, for herbicides, fertilizers, and agronomics
 Southeast Experiment Station near Beresford, for crops and small grains
 West River Ag Center near Rapid City, for outreach in West River

External links

References

1947 establishments in South Dakota
Protected areas established in 1947
Protected areas of Harding County, South Dakota
South Dakota State University
Agricultural research institutes in the United States
Agricultural research stations
Livestock
Research institutes in South Dakota